Metacosmesis xerostola is a moth in the Carposinidae family. It is found in Saudi Arabia.

References

Natural History Museum Lepidoptera generic names catalog

Carposinidae